was an administrative district in Chiba Prefecture Japan. The district was dissolved April 1, 1991 when the town of Sodegaura gained city status.

Location
Kimitsy District covered the area of the present day cities of Kisarazu, Futtsu, Kimitsu, and Sodegaura.

History
The district office for all three of these districts was in the village of Kisarazu. The three districts were formally merged into the new Kimitsu District on April 1, 1897.

As created, Kimitsu District initially consisted of two towns (Kururi and Kisarazu) and 17 villages. The town of Kisarazu merged with the villages of Takene, Kiyokawa, and Namioka to form the city of Kisarazu on November 3, 1942. The towns of Kimitsu and Futtsu gained city status on September 1, 1971. The town of Sodegaura gained city status on April 1, 1991, upon which Kimitsu District creased to exist.

See also
 List of dissolved districts of Japan

Former districts of Chiba Prefecture